Alain Hutchinson (born 10 December 1949) is a Belgian politician and Member of the European Parliament for the French Community of Belgium with the Parti Socialiste, part of the Socialist Group and sits on the European Parliament's Committee on Development where he is Coordinator for the Socialist group.

He is a substitute for the Subcommittee on Human Rights and a vice-chair of the Delegation for relations with the Maghreb countries and the Arab Maghreb Union (including Libya).

Education
 1970: Social worker

Career
 1972-1987: Secretary of the FGTB employees' union
 1988-1989: Head of the office of the Minister for Social Welfare and Health, French-Speaking Community of Belgium
 1989-1999: Head of the office of the Premier of the Brussels-Capital Region
 1988-1999: Deputy Mayor for education and culture, Saint-Gilles
 1999-2004: State Secretary for housing and energy, Brussels-Capital Region
 Minister for the Budget and Social Welfare, French Community Commission

Decorations
 Knight of the Order of the Crown (Belgium)
 Commander of the Order of Leopold II

See also 
 2004 European Parliament election in Belgium

External links
 Personal Website
 SOSposte.eu Website
 
 

1949 births
People from Schaerbeek
Living people
Knights of the Order of the Crown (Belgium)
Commanders of the Order of Leopold II
Socialist Party (Belgium) MEPs
MEPs for Belgium 2004–2009